The 2014 West Coast Conference men's basketball tournament was held March 6–11, 2014 at the Orleans Arena in Paradise, Nevada. This was the sixth consecutive year the WCC Tournament took place in Vegas after the WCC and the Orleans reached a 3-year extension to keep the tournament in Vegas through 2016.

Format
With the addition of the University of the Pacific, the WCC went to a more traditional tournament format. Under the new format, the top 6 seeds earned a bye out of the first round while the 7 seed plays the 10 seed and the 8 seed plays the 9 seed. The first round, which began on a Thursday, aired on BYUtv.

The 8 teams that advanced to the second round had a bye on Friday while the women's second round was completed. The men's second round became the quarterfinal round. It took place on Saturday and had the 1 seed playing the winner of the 8/9 game and the 2 seed playing the winner of the 7/10 game. The quarterfinals also featured the 3 seed playing the 6 seed, and the 4 seed playing the 5 seed. The two evening quarterfinal games aired on ESPN2 while the afternoon games aired on BYUtv.

Continuing a normal procedure for WCC men's and women's tournaments, no games were played on Sunday. All conference members were founded as faith-based schools, and all but Pacific are financially supported by churches. Most significantly, BYU has a strict policy against Sunday play. Instead, the four remaining teams had an off day and prepared for the semifinals on Monday.

The semifinals took place on Monday with the winner of 1/8/9 playing the winner of 4/5 and the winner of 2/7/10 playing the winner of 3/6. One of the semifinals aired on ESPN2, and the other aired on ESPN.

The championship took place on Tuesday and featured the semifinal winners. As in recent years, the championship game was broadcast on ESPN and nationally on the radio by Westwood One.

Seeds
WCC Tiebreaker procedures are as follows:
Head-to-head
Better record against a higher seed
Higher RPI

* Overall record at end of regular season

Schedule

Bracket

Game summaries

Portland vs. Loyola Marymount
Series History: Loyola Marymount leads 47-44
Broadcasters: Dave McCann and Blaine Fowler

Pacific vs. Santa Clara
Series History: Santa Clara leads 90-42
Broadcasters: Dave McCann and Blaine Fowler

San Francisco vs. San Diego
Series History: San Francisco leads 39-34
Broadcasters: Dave McCann and Blaine Fowler

BYU vs. Loyola Marymount
Series History: BYU leads 5-4
Broadcasters: Dave McCann and Blaine Fowler

Gonzaga vs. Santa Clara
Series History: Gonzaga leads 50-32
Broadcasters: Dave Flemming and Sean Farnham

Saint Mary's vs. Pepperdine
Series History: Pepperdine leads 68-62
Broadcasters: Dave Flemming and Sean Farnham

Gonzaga vs. Saint Mary's
Series History: Gonzaga leads 59-27
Broadcasters: Dave Flemming and Sean Farnham

BYU vs. San Francisco
Series History: BYU leads 10-7
Broadcasters: Dave Flemming and Sean Farnham

WCC Championship: BYU vs. Gonzaga
Series History: Gonzaga leads 6-3
Broadcasters: Dave Flemming and Sean Farnham

All-tournament team
Tournament MVP in bold.

See also
2013-14 NCAA Division I men's basketball season
West Coast Conference men's basketball tournament
2013–14 West Coast Conference men's basketball season
2014 West Coast Conference women's basketball tournament

References

Tournament
West Coast Conference men's basketball tournament
West Coast Athletic Conference men's basketball tournament
West Coast Athletic Conference men's basketball tournament
Basketball competitions in the Las Vegas Valley
College basketball tournaments in Nevada
College sports tournaments in Nevada